The Life Peerages Act 1958 established the modern standards for the creation of life peers by the Sovereign of the United Kingdom.

Background
This Act was made during the Conservative governments of 1957–1964, when Harold Macmillan was Prime Minister.  Elizabeth II had ascended to the throne just over five years before the Act.  The Conservatives tried to introduce life peerages to modernise the House of Lords, give it more legitimacy, and respond to a decline in its numbers and attendance. The Labour Party opposed the Life Peerages Bill on Second Reading: Hugh Gaitskell made an impassioned speech against the proposals, arguing for a far more fundamental reform such as total dismantling of the Lords or a wholly elected house.

Summary
Prior to the Life Peerages Act 1958, membership in the House of Lords was strictly male and overwhelmingly based on possession of a hereditary title. There existed a few exceptions to the hereditary principle, such as for the Lords Spiritual. The Act made it possible for life peers of both sexes to be members of the Lords. Life peers are either barons (a title in existence since the Middle Ages; holders are usually known as Lord for all but the most formal documents) or baronesses (where female; conventionally they choose to be known as "Lady X" or "Baroness X" as preferred) and are members of the House of Lords for life, but their titles and membership in the House of Lords cannot be inherited by their children. Judicial life peers already sat in the House under the terms of the Appellate Jurisdiction Act 1876. The Life Peerages Act greatly increased the ability of Prime Ministers to change the composition of the House of Lords by permitting the creation of groups of life peers rather than hereditary peerages. This gradually diminished the numerical dominance of hereditary peers.

The Act allowed for the creation of female peers entitled to sit in the House of Lords. The first such women peers were four: Barbara Wootton and Stella Isaacs, who were sworn in on 21 October 1958, and Katharine Elliot and Irene Curzon, who took office the next day.

A life peer is created by the sovereign by Letters Patent under the Great Seal on the advice of the Prime Minister.

Before the Act was enacted, former Prime Ministers were usually created hereditary Viscounts or Earls in recognition of their public service in high office, as were the Viceroys of India and exceptional military or front bench figures, for example the former Secretary of State for India and earlier for Air, Viscount Stansgate, and retired Speakers of the House of Commons.  The last Prime Minister and the last non-royal to be created an Earl was coincidentally one of the 1958 Act's proponents, Harold Macmillan, on Margaret Thatcher's advice, in the 1980s. Since her time, only members of the Royal Family have been granted new hereditary peerages. In 2023, Prince Edward, already hereditary Earl of Wessex and Forfar, was made Duke of Edinburgh for life, though not under the Act.

Historic approval and 1999 adjustment of House composition

In 1999, during the debate which secured the removal of the constitutional functions of most hereditary peers, the Minister for Constitutional Affairs, Geoff Hoon stated: 

After this agreed with a question from fellow Labour MP, Mark Fisher which stated:

See also
Life peer
Peerages in the United Kingdom
Parliament Act 1911
Peerage Act 1963 – act that permitted disclaimer (renunciation, unless later claimed) of peerages
For example, (14th) Earl of Home (before and after Alec Douglas-Home) or (2nd) Viscount Stansgate (before and after Tony Benn). 
House of Lords Act 1999 – act that restricted the right of hereditary peers to sit in the House of Lords to only 92, elected among all hereditary peers
List of related life peers

Further reading
Digital Reproduction of the Original Act on the Parliamentary Archives catalogue

Notes and references
Notes 
  
References

External links

UK Parliament website about the Life Peerages Act

United Kingdom Acts of Parliament 1958
Peerage of the United Kingdom
Constitutional laws of the United Kingdom
Acts of the Parliament of the United Kingdom concerning the House of Lords
Harold Macmillan